The women's 500 m time trial competition at the 2020 UEC European Track Championships was held on 15 November 2020.

Results

References

Women's 500 m time trial
European Track Championships – Women's 500 m time trial